Patrick Robinson may refer to:

Patrick Robinson (athlete) (born 1943), Jamaican Olympic sprinter
Patrick Robinson (author) (born 1940), British novelist and newspaper columnist
Patrick Robinson (fashion designer) (born 1966), American fashion designer 
Patrick Lipton Robinson (born 1944), United Nations judge
Patrick Robinson (actor) (born 1963), English actor
Patrick Robinson (wide receiver) (born 1969), American football wide receiver
Patrick Robinson (cornerback) (born 1987), American football cornerback
Patrick Robinson (cyclist) (born 1994), British freeride mountain biker

See also
Pat Robinson (disambiguation)